St Barnabas' Church is in West Street, Crewe, Cheshire, England. It is an active Anglican parish church in the deanery of Nantwich, the archdeaconry of Macclesfield, and the diocese of Chester. The church is recorded in the National Heritage List for England as a designated Grade II listed building.

History

The church was built in 1884–85 to a design by the Lancaster partnership of Paley and Austin, and was paid for by the London and North Western Railway, being built near to its workshops. The church provided seating for 500 people at an estimated cost of £4,000 (equivalent to £ in ).

Architecture

Exterior
St Barnabas' is constructed in brick and red terracotta with red tiled roofs. The architectural style is Perpendicular. Its plan consists of a three-bay nave, north and south aisles, a single-bay chancel, and a southeast vestry. Towards the west end is a shingled flèche. On each side of the church are three cross-gables containing the aisle windows that are timbered at the apexes. The gables at the east and west ends of the church are also timbered.

Interior
The authors of the Buildings of England series describe the interior of the church as "noble – clear, spacious and open, without being in the least bleak". The arcades consist of terracotta arches carried on pink sandstone piers. Between the nave and the chancel is an open timber screen. At the west end of the nave is a glazed screen forming a baptistry. The reredos and the pulpit are decorated with carving. In the seven-light east window is stained glass dated 1901. The two-manual organ was built in 1887 by Wadsworth, and extended in 1957 by J. W. Walker.

See also

Listed buildings in Crewe
List of ecclesiastical works by Paley and Austin

References

Churches completed in 1886
19th-century Church of England church buildings
Gothic Revival church buildings in England
Gothic Revival architecture in Cheshire
Church of England church buildings in Cheshire
Grade II listed churches in Cheshire
Diocese of Chester
Paley and Austin buildings
Buildings and structures in Crewe